The General Workers' Union (GWU) is a national trade union center in Malta.
The GWU was founded in 1943 and has been politically identified with the Labour Party as the trade union is the major left-wing trade union in Malta. The two were statutorily fused from 1978 to 1992, and continue to share many common objectives.

The GWU is the largest trade union movement in Malta and organised in a confederation format of 8 Sections each to an extent autonomous in conducting industrial relations. It is one of the two trade union centers recognised by the European Trade Union Confederation and the employees representative delegation at the International Labour Organization. The sections cover the manufacturing, services and the public sector of the Maltese labour market and thus organise a wide cross section of interests.

The union is affiliated to the International Trade Union Confederation and the European Trade Union Confederation as well as various sectoral international and European trade union federations covering the same sectors the GWU is organised therein.

The 8 Sections of the Union covering most sectors of the economy are:
 Government and Public Entities;
 Professionals Finance and Services;
 Chemical and Energy;
 Manufacturing;
 Hospitality and Foods;
 Maritime and Aviation;
 Metal and Construction,
 Technology Electronics and Communications.

Newspapers 
Through its media and printing company Union Print Co., the GWU publishes the newspapers It-Torċa and L-Orizzont.

GWU Youths 

The GWU Youth Section is active amongst youths affiliated to the GWU by projecting their voice both internally, within the GWU structure, and externally, on a national and international level . The section is affiliated with UNI Youths, ETUC Youths, and ICFTU Youths.

References

Notes

External links
 

Trade unions in Malta
International Trade Union Confederation
Trade unions established in 1943
Organisations based in Valletta